Bad Sister may refer to:

Film
Bad Sister (1931 film), American drama starring Conrad Nagel and Sidney Fox
Bad Sister (1947 film), American title for British episodic drama The White Unicorn
The Bad Sister, 1983 British television feature directed by English film theorist Laura Mulvey
Bad Sister, 1998 American pornographic feature starring Shayla LaVeaux
Bad Sister (2014 film), Mandarin-language Chinese romantic comedy directed by Kim Tae-kyun
Bad Sister, 2016 American television film starring Alyshia Ochse, Devon Werkheiser, and Ryan Newman

Literature
The Bad Sister, 1978 book by Scottish-English author Emma Tennant
The Bad Sister, 2005 book by English writer and broadcaster Denise Robertson

Music
Bad Sister (album) (1989), by American hip-hop vocalist Roxanne Shanté

See also
Three Bad Sisters (1956), American drama film directed by Gilbert Kay
"Good Sister/Bad Sister", on the 1991 album Pretty on the Inside by Hole
"Big Bad Sister", on the 1991 album Act Like You Know (MC Lyte album) by rapper MC Lyte
My Bad Sister, 2010s English musical duo of twins Polly and Sophie Duniam
Bad Sisters, 2011 novel by Lauren Henderson under the pen name Rebecca Chance
Bad Sisters (TV series)